Vincenzo Trucco was a racing driver from Milan, Italy. He was the Isotta Fraschini works driver and won the 1908 Targa Florio and participated to Indy 500 in 1913. Trucco was also friend and mentor of Alfieri Maserati, with whom he patented the spark plug.

Indy 500 results

References

Italian racing drivers
Indianapolis 500 drivers
Year of birth missing
Year of death missing